Marie-Désiré Martin-Beaulieu (11 April 1791 – 21 December 1863) was a French composer and concert organizer.

Life 
Born in Paris, Beaulieu was the son of an artillery officer and descendant of a rich cloth merchant family based in Niort. He adopted the name Beaulieu after the Beaulieu estate bought by his grandfather in 1761.

Beaulieu had violin lessons with a musician named Alliaume, a student of Isidore Bertheaume (about 1751–1802) and from 1803 with Rodolphe Kreutzer. Since 1805 he had composition lessons with Angelo Maria Benincori (1779–1821), later with Abbé Nicolas Roze. From 1809 he attended the class of Étienne-Nicolas Méhul at the Conservatoire de Paris. In 1811, he won the Premier Grand Prix de Rome with the cantata Héro et Léandre after a libretto by Jacques Bins de Saint-Victor.

However, he renounced his stay in Rome and settled with his wife Francoise Caroline Rouget de Gourcez in Niort, where her father had been mayor until the French Revolution. Nevertheless, he fulfilled his obligations as a winner of the Prix de Rome and sent several church music pieces to the Académie des Beaux-Arts. After the death of his teacher Méhul, he composed a Requiem in 1819, which was also performed in 1851 in memory of Kreutzer and in 1863 for his own funeral.

In 1827, he founded a "Société Philharmonique" in Niort, from which the "Association musicale de l'Ouest" was born in collaboration with the violinist and conductor Jules Norès. This was the first symphonic association in the region to organise concerts in Niort, La Rochelle, Angoulème, Rochefort, Poitiers and Limoges and to organise an annual musical congress. The society was active until 1879 and led among other things Mendelssohns' oratorios Paulus and Elias, Händels Alexander's Feast, Ludwig Wilhelm Maurers Symphonie concertante and Antonin Reicha's wind quintets.

In 1863 Beaulieu founded the Fondation Beaulieu in Paris, which he endowed by will with a capital of 100,000 francs. The foundation had a great influence on musical life in Paris until the First World War. Its chairmen were Ambroise Thomas (bis 1895), Henri Colmet-Daage (1896), Théodore Dubois (1897–1910) and Camille Saint-Saëns, the musical directors were Adolphe Deloffre (1864–73), Guillot de Sainbris (1874–87), Jules Danbé (1888–1905), Georges Marty (1905–08) and Gabriel Pierné.

Vocal music was at the centre of Beaulieu's compositional work. In addition to operas, cantatas and lyrical scenes, he composed secular and religious choral works as well as songs and romances with different accompaniments and two string quartets.

Interested in public life in his city, Beaulieu was a member of the city council of Niort from 1840 until his death in 1863.

Works 
Alcyone, Scène dramatique (text by Antoine-Vincent Arnault), 1808
Céphale, Kantate (text by Jean-Baptiste Rousseau), 1808
Circé, Kantate, (text by J. B. Rousseau), 1809
Cupidon pleurant Psyché, Scène dramatique (Text von Arnault) (1809)
Marie-Stuart, Monologue lyrique für Stimme und Orchester (text by Victor-Joseph Étienne de Jouy), 1810
Héro et Léandre, Kantate (text by Jacques Bins de Saint-Victor), 1810
Que le Seigneur est bon for female choir and orchestra, 1810
Présent de Dieux, 1810
Miserere, 1812
Sapho à Leucade, Lyrical scene (text by J. A. Vinaty), 1813
Laudate Dominum in sanctis ejus for two choirs and two orchestras, 1813
Domine salvum fac regem, 1814
Jeanne d'Arc, Kantate, (text by J. A. Vinaty), 1817
Messe de Requiem, 1819
Anacréon, Oper, (text by Gentil Bernard), 1828
Sixième ode sacrée (text by J. B. Rousseau), 1828
Anacréon, Oper (text by Gentil Bernard), 1828
Scène lyrique adressée à Mme la duchesse d'Angoulême à son passage à Niort, 1831
La Prière des matelots, hymne à la Vierge, 1831
Encore un hymne for five-part choir, 1833
Fête bacchique, scene from a cantata by J. B. Rousseau, 1835
Solo de cor avec accompagnement de piano, 1837
Hymne pour la première communion for ensemble, soloists and female choir (text by Émile Deschamps), 1840
Sombre Océan, for ensemble, choir and soloists, 1841
Hymne du matin, oratorio for soloists, choir and large orchestra (text by Alphonse de Lamartine), 1843
Cantique pour la fête de Sainte Anne, 1845
Messe solennelle Oratorio for soloists, choir and orchestra, 1845
Messe à trois voix for three sopranos and organ, 1845
Ode à la charité, Mélodie religieuse for voice and piano, 1845
Dithyrambe sur l'Immortalité de l'âme par Delille, oratorio, 1850
L'Hymne à la nuit, oratorio (text by Lamertine), 1851
L'Immortalité de l'Ame, oratorio, 1851
La Charité, Hymne für Chor a cappella (text by J. A. Vinaty), 1852
Jeanne d'Arc, Grande scène lyrique, 1853
Philadelphie, Opera, 1855
Marche pour l'Association normande composée à la demande de M. de Caumont, 1855
Salve Regina for solo voice and organ, 1859
O rives du Jourdain for four-part choir and orchestra (text by Jean Racine), 1860
Messe à quatre voix et orchestre, 1862

References 

1791 births
1863 deaths
Musicians from Paris
Conservatoire de Paris alumni
French Romantic composers
19th-century French composers
French male composers
Prix de Rome for composition
19th-century French male musicians
People from Poitou-Charentes